Nikki Amuka-Bird (born 27 February 1976) is a Nigerian-born British actress of the stage, television, and film.

Early life
Amuka-Bird was born in Delta State, Nigeria, where her father still lives. She left there as a young child with her mother and was brought up in England, Lagos and in Antigua. Attending boarding school in Britain, Amuka-Bird originally hoped to be a dancer. That ambition was thwarted by injury:
I hurt my back and at that point was deciding what to do university-wise and I thought I would try for drama college because I knew you could do some dancing there but it didn’t have to take over everything. It was only really when I went to drama college that that world [acting] opened up to me and I fell in love with it and became obsessed like everybody else.

She attended the London Academy of Music and Dramatic Art (LAMDA). She started her stage career with the Royal Shakespeare Company (RSC).

Career

Amuka-Bird's theatrical credits include Welcome to Thebes (National Theatre); Twelfth Night (Bristol Old Vic, for which she won an Ian Charleson Award nomination in 2004 for playing Viola); World Music (Crucible Theatre, Sheffield, and Donmar Warehouse); Top Girls (Oxford Stage Company); A Midsummer Night's Dream, The Tempest and The Servant of Two Masters (RSC); Doubt: A Parable (Tricycle Theatre).

Her film credits include The Omen (2006 remake), Cargo,  as well as the screen adaptation of Alexander McCall Smith's novel The No. 1 Ladies' Detective Agency. On television, Amuka-Bird has appeared in Spooks, The Line of Beauty, The Last Enemy, Robin Hood, an episode of Torchwood, and a recurring role in the reimagined BBC apocalyptic series Survivors. In 2010 she appeared as Det. Supt Gaynor Jenkins in the BBC's Silent Witness.

She appeared in Small Island, the BBC adaptation of Andrea Levy's award-winning novel, broadcast in December 2009. In June 2016 it was announced that she and Phoebe Fox would star in the production of Zadie Smith's novel NW. It was broadcast on BBC Two on 14 November 2016 and Amuka-Bird received a BAFTA nomination for Best Actress.

On Christmas Day 2017, she was heard as the voice of the Glass Woman in the Doctor Who Christmas Special "Twice Upon a Time" broadcast on BBC One.

She is currently playing the role of Rav Mulclair, Head of Judd Mission Control, in HBO's Avenue 5. She recently had a few film roles in 2019 for The Personal History of David Copperfield as Miss Steerforth and 2021 for Old as Patricia, a psychologist with epilepsy.

Personal life
She was married to actor Geoffrey Streatfeild from 2003 to 2010.

Filmography

Film

Television

References

External links
 
 
 Nikki Amuka-Bird at Hamilton Hodell Talent Management.
 Survivors Interview
 Tola Ositelu, Interview with Nikki Amuka-Bird: “Our job as actors is to show the colour of our skin doesn’t matter”, Soul Culture, 17 June 2010.
 Sophia A. Jackson, "Afridiziak Theatre News interview with Nikki Amuka-Bird, Welcome to Thebes", Afridiziak Theatre News, 3 June 2010.
 Radhika Sanghani, "Meet Nikki Amuka-Bird – star of BBC's gritty new Zadie Smith adaptation, NW", The Telegraph, 14 November 2016.

Living people
1976 births
21st-century British actresses
21st-century Nigerian actresses
Actresses from Delta State
Alumni of the London Academy of Music and Dramatic Art
Black British actresses
British stage actresses
British film actresses
British television actresses
Nigerian emigrants to the United Kingdom
Royal Shakespeare Company members